Miniargiolestes is a monotypic genus of damselflies in the family Megapodagrionidae.
The single species of this genus, Miniargiolestes minimus,
commonly known as a stream flatwing, 
is a small damselfly, metallic black to green in colour with white markings.
It is endemic to south-western Australia, where it inhabits streams.

Gallery

See also
 List of Odonata species of Australia

References

Megapodagrionidae
Zygoptera genera
Odonata of Australia
Endemic fauna of Australia
Taxa named by Günther Theischinger
Insects described in 1998
Damselflies